Belém is the capital city of the Brazilian state of Pará.

Belem or Belém may also refer to:

Places 
Brazil
 Belém, Alagoas
 Belém, Paraíba
 Belém (district of São Paulo)

Cape Verde
 Belém, Santiago
 Belém, São Nicolau

Portugal
 Belém (Lisbon)
 Giesteira (or Bairro de Belém), a neighbourhood of Póvoa de Varzim

People 

 Belém (footballer) – Matheus José Belém de Souza, Brazilian football defender.

Other uses 
 Belem (ship), a French three-masted barque
 Belém Tower, a fortified tower located in the Belém district of Lisbon, Portugal
 Belem Prison, a disused prison in Mexico City

See also
 Belemites
 Belén (disambiguation)
 Bethlehem